Gangrena Gasosa is a Brazilian metal band from Rio de Janeiro known for incorporating elements of Umbanda and other Afro-Brazilian religions in their look and music.  The band drew attention for each member representing an religion spirit or entity, dressing as such, and mixing crossover thrash with percussion and umbanda , a mixture that was named by the band members as "saravá metal".

Members

Current lineup 
 Angelo Arede (Zé Pelintra) - vocal
 Eder Santana (Omulú) - vocal
 Minoru Murakami (Exu Caveira) - guitar
 Diego Padilha (Tranca Rua) - bass
 Gê Vasconcelos (Pomba Gira Maria Mulambo) - percussion
 Alex Porto (Exu Tiriri) - drums

Former members 
 Ronaldo Lima (Chorão³) - vocal
 Tony Vomito - vocal
 Paulão - vocal
 Rocco - vocal
 Cristiano - vocal
 Denilson Pacheco - guitar
 Vladimir Rodriguez - guitar
 Alexandre Reder - guitar
 Sapato - bass
 Moreno - bass
 Felipe Coelho - bass
 Anjo Caldas - percussion
 Fábio Lessa - percussion
 Heitor Peralles - percussion
 Elijan "Mutley" Rodrigues - percussion, drums
 Renzo Borges - drums
 Thiago Rafael  - drums
 Cid Mesquita - drums
 Adriano "Magrão" - drums

Discography

Studio albums
 Welcome to Terreiro (1993)
  Smells Like a Tenda Spirita (2000)
 Se Deus É 10, Satanás É 666 (2011)
 Gente Ruim Só Manda Lembrança Pra Quem Não Presta (2018)

EPs 
 6/6/6 (2006)
 Kizila (2020)

DVDs 
 Desagradável (2013)

References

Musical groups established in 1990
Brazilian folk metal musical groups
Brazilian thrash metal musical groups
Brazilian hardcore punk groups
Musical groups from Rio de Janeiro (city)